Tom, Tommy, or Thomas Fitzpatrick may refer to:

 Thomas Fitzpatrick (Australian politician) (1835–1920), Irish-Australian politician 
 Thomas Fitzpatrick (cartoonist) (1860–1912), Irish political cartoonist
 Thomas Fitzpatrick (London physician) (1832–1900), Irish surgeon
 Thomas Fitzpatrick (pilot) (1930–2009),  American pilot
 Thomas Fitzpatrick (Queens) (1909–1972), American lawyer and politician
 Thomas Fitzpatrick (American sailor) (born 1837), American Civil War sailor and Medal of Honor recipient
 Tom Fitzpatrick (Irish sailor) (born 1974), Irish Olympic sailor
 Thomas Fitzpatrick (trapper) (1799–1854), American mountain man
 Thomas B. Fitzpatrick (1919–2003), American dermatologist
 Thomas Benjamin Fitzpatrick (1896–1974), American governor of American Samoa
 Thomas Fitzpatrick (academic) (1861–1931), English university president
 Thomas Henry Fitzpatrick (died 1866), British missionary to the Punjab
 Thomas J. Fitzpatrick (Cavan politician) (1918–2006), Irish politician
 Thomas J. Fitzpatrick (Dublin politician) (born 1926), Irish politician
 Thomas M. Fitzpatrick (1890–1986), American sports coach
 Thomas Y. Fitzpatrick (1850–1906), American politician 
 Tom Fitzpatrick (rugby league), Australian rugby league footballer active 1924–1930
 Tom Fitzpatrick (curler), American curler
 Tommy Fitzpatrick (born 1969), American artist

See also 
 Fitzpatrick (surname)
 Fitzpatrick (disambiguation)